Croda da Lago is a small mountain chain in the central Dolomites in Veneto, northern Italy, just east of the Giau Pass. The highest peak of the group, the Cima d'Ambrizzola has an elevation of 2,715 metres. The range is very popular with hikers and mountain cyclists.

Main Summits
Cima Ambrizzola, 2715 m
Croda da Lago, 2701 m
Cima de Lastoi, 2657 m
Monte Cernera, 2657 m
Becco di Mezzodì, 2603 m

References

Dolomites
Geography of Cortina d'Ampezzo
Mountain ranges of the Alps
Mountain ranges of Italy